Christian Television Network (CTN) is an American non-profit broadcast television network of small owned-and-operated stations (O&O) that broadcasts religious programming. It is based in Largo, Florida (with a mailing address of Clearwater), and the flagship station is WCLF channel 22, which signed on the air in the Tampa Bay region in 1979. It is now available on DirecTV channel 376, Dish Network channel 262, and Glorystar channel 117. The channel was started to produce and broadcast programming to teach and encourage Christian living. It was founded by Robert D'Andrea, who died in January 2022.

Program services
CTN operates three channels:
The main CTN service focuses primarily on televangelism with some alternative medicine infomercials.
CTNi is also televangelism-based but with all programming in Spanish.
CTN Lifestyle includes secular syndicated programming (such as Small Town Big Deal, Positively Paula and Ron Hazelton's HouseCalls) along with some Christian talk shows (The 700 Club, AFA Focal Point), movies and Christian-themed entertainment programs.

Stations (by callsign)
All stations are owned and operated by CTN unless specified. A blue background indicates a station signed on by CTN or a CTN subsidiary.

Former affiliates (by callsign)

Note

Until 2011, Detroit, Michigan-based WLPC-LD also used the CTN and Christian Television Network names, but was never affiliated or associated with this network; that station has since renamed itself as Impact Network.

Programming 

 COME HOME with Jen Mallan
 Man 360
 It's Time With Herman and Sharon (also known as It's Time With Herman and Friends)
 You and Me
 Christian Fitness
 Gospel Voice
 Bridges
 Christian Music Countdown
 The Awakening
 Tightline
 Bayfocus
 Real Life
 In The Blink Of An Eye
 Homekeeper's Classics
 Destined 2 Roam
 Generation Now
 We Got Next

References

External links
Official site

Television networks in the United States
Lists of American television network affiliates
Religious television stations in the United States
Television channels and stations established in 1979
Evangelical television networks
Christian mass media companies
1979 establishments in Florida